Steal the Sky is a 1988 HBO movie directed by John D. Hancock and starring Mariel Hemingway and Ben Cross. The film is based on the true story of Iraqi fighter pilot Munir Redfa, who defected by flying a MiG-21 fighter jet to Israel in 1966. Steal the Sky was the first production under the HBO-Paramount co-financing agreement launched in 1987.

The 1986 story of a female agent of the Israeli Mossad involved in the defection of an Iraqi Israeli nuclear scientist may have also been instrumental in gaining attention for the film. The soundtrack was composed and performed by New age artist Yanni.

Plot
American-born Israeli spy Helen Mason (Mariel Hemingway) is sent to Iraq to coerce an Iraqi pilot into hijacking a Soviet-made fighter jet for Israeli defense research. She seduces Munir Redfa (Ben Cross) in order to blackmail him. There are unexpected results when Helen finds herself falling in love with him, endangering the mission, while he is torn between his love for her and his loyalty to Iraq.

Cast

Production
Steal the Sky was filmed on location in Israel, Rome and Reno, Nevada. The story of Captain Munir Redfa inspired the film, but some aspects of his exploit were not revealed. In one of the Mossad's most significant operations, it was able to smuggle Redfa's entire extended family safely out of Iraq to Israel. Mossad did not have any involvement with Redfa's initial defection.

His MiG-21F-13 fighter was evaluated by the Israeli Air Force and was later loaned to the United States for testing and intelligence analysis. Knowledge obtained from analysis of the aircraft was instrumental to the successes achieved by the Israeli Air Force in its future encounters with Arab MiG-21s.

The aircraft used in the film were three MiG-15/15UTIs (actually ex-Polish SBLim-2s), three T-33s and a Bell Jet Ranger.

Reception
In a 1988 review for the Los Angeles Times, Howard Rosenberg wrote, "Oh, it's watchable enough. But it's a spy/adventure story that lacks suspense, a love story whose lovers lack intensity, a Middle Eastern story ... that lacks historical and political definition." He concludes, "It's love, adventure – and schmaltz – the Middle East."

Film historian and critic Leonard Maltin wrote in Leonard Maltin's Movie Guide that it was a "pretentious, melodramatic misfire."

Honors
In the 1989 Primetime Emmy Awards, Steal the Sky was nominated for Outstanding Sound Editing for a Miniseries or a Special. Additionally, Ben Cross was nominated as Best Actor in a Movie or Miniseries, while Steal the Sky was nominated for Editing and Direction of Photography for a Dramatic Special or Series/Theatrical Special/Movie or Miniseries in the 1989 CableACE Awards.

See also
 Operation Diamond

References

Notes

Bibliography

 Barnes, Thornton D. MiGs Over Nevada: MiG Exploitation Projects at Area 51. San Bernardino, California: Createspace, 2014. .
 Maltin, Leonard. Leonard Maltin's Movie Guide 2009. New York: New American Library, 2009 (originally published as TV Movies, then Leonard Maltin’s Movie & Video Guide), First edition 1969, published annually since 1988. .

External links
 
 
 
 Stealing a Soviet MiG, article at JewishVirtualLibrary.org

1988 television films
1988 films
American aviation films
American spy films
1980s spy films
Films about the Mossad
American films based on actual events
Films directed by John D. Hancock
Films set in 1966
Films set in Iraq
Films set in Israel
HBO Films films
Films with screenplays by Christopher Wood (writer)
1980s American films